is a Japanese football player who currently plays for Tochigi City FC.

Club statistics
Updated to 23 February 2018.

References

External links

1990 births
Living people
Meiji University alumni
Association football people from Kanagawa Prefecture
Japanese footballers
J2 League players
Mito HollyHock players
Tochigi City FC players
Association football forwards